Wheat prices in Britain spiked in 1795, following an almost 40% drop in domestic grain output per acre. Popular pressure forced the British Government to charter transport vessels to import rice from Bengal. 

The price of a "Winchester bushel" averaged about 6s 6d in 1794, but peaked at 13s 6d in August 1795. The price did not return to 6s 6d until March 1796. During the period of high prices municipal governments in towns such as Oxford and Cambridge seized cargoes of wheat passing through them, something that was illegal. There were bread riots in July-August 1795 in some 14 towns, which came to be known as the revolt of the housewives. Burials increased substantially in 1795 relative to 1794 and 1796. In response, the British Government took over the import of grains from abroad. All wheat imported up to the end of 1795 had been purchased on government account. It came either on government vessels or vessels chartered to the government. 

Because the British East India Company (EIC) had a legal monopoly on all trade between Britain and India, the Government worked through the EIC for imports from Bengal. The EIC notified its administration in Bengal of the government's requirements; the government in Bengal then engaged vessels already there.

Absent original research, there appears to be only one readily available list of vessels chartered. There is nothing to indicate whether the list is exhaustive or only partial. Of the 14 vessels listed, 10 succeeded in arriving in Britain. The French captured two while they were en route, and two were wrecked. 

The decision to import rice from Bengal lead to a similar program in 1800–1802. That time the program involved at least 28 vessels. Only two were lost.

Notes, citations, and references
Notes

Citations

References
House of Commons, Parliament, Great Britain (1812) Parliamentary Papers. (H.M. Stationery Office). 
  
Stern, Walter M. (May 1964) "The Bread crisis in Britain, 1795–96", Economica, Vol. 31, No. 122, pp.168-187.

Age of Sail merchant ships of England
Lists of sailing ships